Ivan Santos may refer to
Ivan Santos (footballer, born 1988), Portuguese footballer
Ivan Santos (footballer, born 1982), Brazilian footballer
Ivan Santos (athlete), Santomean pole vaulter
Ivan Santos (musician), Brazilian guitar player and singer